Widad Haroun or Widad al-Azhari was a Syrian lawyer and politician. In 1960, she and Jihan al-Mosli were appointed to the National Assembly of the United Arab Republic, becoming the first Syrian women to enter parliament.

Biography
Originally from Latakia, in July 1960 Haroun was appointed to the National Assembly of the United Arab Republic alongside al-Mosli. They left the Assembly when Syria seceded from the United Arab Republic in September the following year.

References

People from Latakia
Syrian women  lawyers
20th-century Syrian women politicians
20th-century Syrian politicians
Members of the National Assembly of the United Arab Republic
Possibly living people
20th-century Syrian lawyers